952 Caia  is a carbonaceous background asteroid from the outer region of the asteroid belt, approximately  in diameter. It was discovered by Soviet–Russian astronomer Grigory Neujmin at the Crimean Simeiz Observatory on 27 October 1916 and given the provisional designation . It was named after the heroine in the novel Quo Vadis by Henryk Sienkiewicz.

Orbit and classification 

Caia is a non-family asteroid from the main belt's background population. It orbits the Sun in the outer asteroid belt at a distance of 2.3–3.7 AU once every 5 years and 2 months (1,893 days). Its orbit has an eccentricity of 0.25 and an inclination of 10° with respect to the ecliptic.

The body's odd provisional designation, was assigned at the discovering Simeiz Observatory during the First World War, when communication with the German Astronomisches Rechen-Institut, then in charge of assigning designations, was not possible over long periods of time. Instead, the observatory assigned their own, custom provisional designations containing the Greek letter sigma (Σ), in order to avoid multiple assignments. For simplicity, the letter sigma is often represented by the letter "S".

Naming 

This minor planet was named after "Caia", a heroine in the historical novel Quo Vadis written by Polish journalist, novelist and laureate of the Nobel Prize in Literature in 1905, Henryk Sienkiewicz (1846–1916).

Physical characteristics 

Caia is a carbonaceous C-type asteroid. It is also classified as a P-type asteroid by NASA's Wide-field Infrared Survey Explorer (WISE).

Rotation period 

Two photoelectric lightcurve observations from 1980 rendered a rotation period of 7.50 and 7.51 hours, while a more recent light-curve analysis in 2004 gave a period of  hours (or half the previously determined period) with a very low brightness variation of 0.03 in magnitude, which typically indicates a nearly spheroidal shape.

Diameter and albedo 

According to the surveys carried out by the Infrared Astronomical Satellite, IRAS, the Japanese Akari satellite, and the WISE telescope with its subsequent NEOWISE mission, the asteroid has a diameter between 81.6 and 88.8 kilometers and a low albedo in the range of 0.040 and 0.056. The Collaborative Asteroid Lightcurve Link agrees with the spaced-based observations and derives an albedo of 0.051 with a corresponding diameter of 81.5 kilometers.

References

External links 
 Asteroid Lightcurve Database (LCDB), query form (info )
 Dictionary of Minor Planet Names, Google books
 Asteroids and comets rotation curves, CdR – Observatoire de Genève, Raoul Behrend
 Discovery Circumstances: Numbered Minor Planets (1)-(5000) – Minor Planet Center
 
 

000952
Discoveries by Grigory Neujmin
Named minor planets
19161027